Sikri Vyas is a village near Kotra in Jalaun district, Uttar Pradesh, India.

The village is located at 25.807001N79.355175E, near the river Betwa.

References 

Villages in Jalaun district